Frank Caputo is a Canadian politician who was elected to represent the riding of Kamloops—Thompson—Cariboo in the House of Commons of Canada in the 2021 Canadian federal election.

Prior to being elected, Caputo was a Crown prosecutor and instructor at Thompson Rivers University.

References

External links

Living people
Year of birth missing (living people)
Members of the House of Commons of Canada from British Columbia
Conservative Party of Canada MPs
21st-century Canadian politicians
Canadian prosecutors
Lawyers in British Columbia
People from Kamloops
Academic staff of Thompson Rivers University